Hermann Köchly (born Leipzig, 5 August 1815; died Trieste, 3 December 1876) was a German philologist and educational reformer.

Biography
He studied at Leipzig, taught at the Saalfeld Progymnasium (1837) and at the Dresden Kreuzschule (1840). In February 1849, Köchly was elected to the lower house of the Kingdom of Saxony, but that same year was forced to flee to Brussels on account of his participation in the May insurrection. He was appointed professor of classical philology at Zürich in 1851, and at Heidelberg in 1864. He was a member of the Reichstag from 1871 to 1873 and attached himself to the Progressive Party.

Works

Educational reform
 Ueber das Princip des Gymnasialunterrichts der Gegenwart (Principals for gymnasial instruction for modern times, 1845)
 Zur Gymnasialreform (Reforming gymnasiums, 1846)
The scheme set forth in these pamphlets stressed the natural sciences, and, in Latin and Greek, urged emphasis on content rather than on grammar and style, and the gradual abolition of speaking and writing those languages. The plan was adopted in Saxony almost immediately.

Grecian epics
 Critical essays on Quintus Smyrnæus (Leipzig, 1830)
 Hesiod, in collaboration with Gottfried Kinkel (1870)
 An edition of Aratus, Manethonis, Maximi et aliorum astrologica (Paris, 1851)
 An edition of the text of Apostelesmata (Leipzig, 1858)
 Dionysiaca of Nonnos (Leipzig, 1858)
 Seven dissertations on De Iliadis carminibus (Zürich, 1850–59)
 De diversis Hesiodeæ Theogoniæ partibus (Zürich, 1860)
 Iliadis Carmina XVI (1861)
 Three dissertations on De Odysseæ carminibus (Zürich, 1862–63)
 Opuscula epica IV (Zürich, 1864).

Ancient military subjects
 Geschichte des Griechischen Kriegswesens (Aarau, 1852)
 Griechische Kriegsschriftsteller (Leipzig, 1853–55), vol. 1, vol. 2 part 1, vol. 2 part 2.
 Einleitung in Cäsars Kommentarien über den gallischen Krieg (Gotha, 1857)
 Onosandri de imperatoris officio Liber (Leipzig, 1860)

Others' works
 An edition of Arrian's Anabasis (1861)
 Editions of Euripides and Iphigenia in Taurien (1863)
 An edition of Medea (1867)

He did translations, especially of Caesar, Aeschylus, etc. A collection of his smaller works is found in his Opuscula academica (Leipzig, 1853–56), Akademische Vorträge und Reden (Zürich, 1856) and Opuscula philologica (Leipzig 1881–82).

Further reading
 Hug, Hermann Köchly (Basle, 1878)
 Böckel, Hermann Köchly, ein Bild seines Lebens und seiner Persönlichkeit (Heidelberg, 1904)

Notes

References
Attribution
 
 

1815 births
1876 deaths
Writers from Leipzig
People from the Kingdom of Saxony
German Lutherans
German Progress Party politicians
Members of the Second Chamber of the Diet of the Kingdom of Saxony
Members of the 1st Reichstag of the German Empire
Forty-Eighters
German philologists
People educated at the Kreuzschule
Academic staff of the University of Zurich
Academic staff of Heidelberg University
19th-century Lutherans